Agena may refer to:

Keiko Agena (1973), an American actress
Beta Centauri, a star
RM-81 Agena, a rocket upper stage family developed by Lockheed, especially the Agena target vehicle used in preparation for the Apollo program lunar missions
AMD K10, a processor codenamed "Agena"

See also 
 Aegina (disambiguation)